John Matthew Markham (October 1, 1908 – March 10, 1975) was an American baseball pitcher in the Negro leagues. He played from 1930 to 1946 with several teams, including the Kansas City Monarchs and the Birmingham Black Barons.

References

External links
 and Seamheads

1908 births
1975 deaths
Kansas City Monarchs players
Birmingham Black Barons players
Baseball players from Louisiana
20th-century African-American sportspeople
Baseball pitchers
Cincinnati Crescents players
Sportspeople from Shreveport, Louisiana